Alexander Nikolayevich Senkevich (born 1941) is a Russian Indologist, philologist, translator from Hindi, writer, and poet. Also he is known as Helena Blavatsky's biographer.

Biography
Born in Moscow, USSR, Senkevich studied Indian literature at Institute of Oriental Languages. From 1970 he works for Gorky Institute of World Literature. He translated many works of eminent Hindi poets of 20th-century: Ashok Vajpeyi, Gajanan Madhav Muktibodh, Ganga Prasad Vimal, Harivanshrai Bachchan, Raghuvir Sahay, Sachchidananda Vatsyayan, Sarveshwar Dayal Saxena. In 1990 he obtained his Doktor nauk diploma. Senkevich is author of over 100 articles, many books and brochures.

Senkevich is a member of Union of Russian Writers. His first verses have been published in 1967 in Komsomolskaya Pravda. He took part in large scientific Indological conferences (1983, 1986, 1989). He is an initiator and the head of many Transhimalaya expeditions. In 1999 he became the head of "Russia-India Society."

Publications

Translations
 На ступеньках в солнцепёк. (1978) (in co-authorship)
 Из современной индийской поэзии. (1980) (in co-authorship)
 Сахай Рагхувир. Избранное. (1983)
 Индийская поэзия ХХ века, том 1. (1990)
 Индийская поэзия ХХ века, том 2. (1990)

Poetry
 Случайная игра. (1994)
 Чувство бытия. (2002)
 Мерцающая тьма. (2004)
 Предвестие. (2007)
 Западание клавиш. (2010)
 Скользящие тени. (2011)

External links
 Биографическая справка на сайте издательства Молодая гвардия.
 Сенкевич и другие. Публикация Культурного центра им. Н. К. Рериха.

References

Sources
 

1941 births
Living people
20th-century Russian poets
21st-century Russian poets
21st-century male writers
Translators from Hindi
Soviet translators
Soviet philologists
Soviet poets
Soviet male writers
20th-century Russian male writers
Russian Indologists
Russian male poets
Writers from Moscow
20th-century Russian translators
20th-century philologists